Mount David Douglas is a summit in Lane County, Oregon, in the United States. The peak was named for David Douglas, a Scottish botanist. The Douglas Fir was also named in honor of David Douglas.

References

Mountains of Lane County, Oregon
Mountains of Oregon